The 1951 New Mexico Lobos football team represented the University of New Mexico in the Skyline Conference during the 1951 college football season.  In their second season under head coach Dudley DeGroot, the Lobos compiled a 4–7 record (2–4 against Skyline opponents), tied for sixth in the conference, and were outscored by opponents by a total of 262 to 213.

Schedule

References

New Mexico
New Mexico Lobos football seasons
New Mexico Lobos football